Sir Bernard Ledwidge  (9 November 1915 – 20 February 1998) was a British diplomat and writer. Ledwidge served as the British Ambassador to Finland from 1969 to 1972 and the British Ambassador to Israel from 1972 to 1975. Ledwidge also served as the Chairman of the United Kingdom Committee for UNICEF from 1976 to 1989.

Early life 
William Bernard John Ledwidge was born on 9 November 1915 in London, United Kingdom to Charles Ledwidge and Eileen O'Sullivan.

Ledwidge was educated at Cardinal Vaughan School, a Roman Catholic day school in Holland Park, London. Ledwidge also attended King's College, Cambridge and Princeton University. Ledwidge spent time as a Commonwealth Fund Fellow from 1937 to 1939.

Career 
Ledwidge joined the India Office in 1939 as an Assistant Principal.

Military service 
Ledwidge fought in the Second World War, joining the Royal Artillery in India in 1940. He then joined the Indian Army in 1941, where he served until the end of the war in 1945.

Ledwidge was appointed a Companion of the Order of St Michael and St George (CMG) in 1964.

Diplomatic career 
Ledwidge pursued a career in international diplomacy. He worked as a diplomat in the United states, in Afghanistan and in Berlin. In 1966, he was appointed Minister at the British Embassy in Paris. He remained in this position until 1969.

Ambassador to Finland 
Ledwidge was appointed the British Ambassador to Finland in 1969, succeeding Sir David Scott Fox.

Upon leaving this appointment in 1972, Ledwidge is reported to have said "it could plausibly be argued that it is a misfortune for anybody but a Finn to spend three years in Finland, as I have just done".

Ambassador to Israel 
Ledwidge was appointed the British Ambassador to Israel in 1972, succeeding Anthony Elliott.

Ledwidge was raised to a Knight of the Order of St Michael and St George (KCMG) in 1974.

On 15 June 1975, the Israeli Foreign Minister, Yigal Allon, summoned Ledwidge to raise concern over reports of impending Anglo-Egyptian arms deals.

Ledwidge left this appointment in 1975.

Ledwidge was the Chairman of the United Kingdom Committee for UNICEF from 1976 to 1989.

Writing 
Ledwidge published his first book, a novel based on his experience in India, called "Frontiers" in 1979.

In 1983, he published a biography of Charles de Gaulle. Critics noted the author's admiration for the French statesman. A French translation of this book was published the following year.

Death 
Ledwidge died on 20 February 1998 in London, United Kingdom.

Personal life 
Ledwidge married his first wife, Anne Kingsley, in 1948. They had two children together, a son and a daughter. The marriage was dissolved in 1970. Ledwidge married his second wife, Flora Groult, in 1970. Ledwidge was a member of the Travellers Club and the Marylebone Cricket Club. Ledwidge spoke French.

Honours

Publications

See also 

 Finland-United Kingdom relations

 Israel–United Kingdom relations

References

External links 

 

1915 births
1998 deaths
British diplomats
Ambassadors of the United Kingdom to Finland
Ambassadors of the United Kingdom to Israel
British Army personnel of World War II
Royal Artillery personnel
British Indian Army personnel
Military personnel from London